Paul Cooper (May 19, 1926; Victoria, Illinois – April 4, 1996; Houston, Texas) was an American composer and teacher of classical music.

Born in Victoria, Illinois, he received degrees from the University of Southern California, where his teachers included Ernest Kanitz, Halsey Stevens, and Roger Sessions. He also studied with Nadia Boulanger as a Fulbright Fellow from 1953-1954.

Cooper taught at the University of Michigan School of Music and the University of Cincinnati College Conservatory of Music prior to joining the Rice University Shepherd School of Music as a founding member in 1974. He remained there until his death in 1996, at which time he held the Lynette S. Autrey Endowed Chair and was the Composer-in-Residence at the Shepherd School.

In addition to a Fulbright, he was the recipient of a Guggenheim Fellowship as well as grants from the National Endowment for the Arts, the National Academy and Institute of Arts and Letters, and from the Ford, Rockefeller, and Rackham Foundations. Some of his notable students include Gabriela Lena Frank, Svend Nielsen, and Ellsworth Milburn. 

While Cooper experimented with compositional techniques popular during the middle of the twentieth century, including serialism and aleatory, much of his music follows traditional structures, with numerous works in "absolute (established) forms," including six string quartets, numerous concertos (including two for violin, one for saxophone, and one for flute), and six symphonies. Ross Lee Finney characterized Cooper's music as having "a deep emotional motivation and at the same time a simplicity and clarity that comes from his mastery of craft."

Selected works
Symphonies
Symphony no. 1, 1966
Symphony no. 2 "Antiphons," 1971
Symphony no. 3 "Lamentations," 1971
Symphony no. 4 "Landscape," 1973-75
Symphony no. 5, 1982–83
Symphony no. 6 "In Memoriam," 1987
Concertos
Violin Concerto No. 1, 1967
Descants, for Viola and Orchestra, 1975
Cello Concerto, 1977
Violin Concerto No. 2, 1980–82
Flute Concerto, 1981–82
Organ Concerto, 1982
Saxophone Concerto, 1982
Double Concerto for Violin, Viola and Orchestra, 1987
Chamber music
Piano Quintet, 1995
String Quartet No. 1, 1952 (rev. 1978) 
String Quartet No. 2, 1954 (rev. 1979)
String Quartet No. 3, 1959 
String Quartet No. 4, 1964 
String Quartet No. 5, 1973 
String Quartet No. 6, 1977 
Sonata for Viola and Piano, 1961
Sonata for Violin and Piano, 1962
Sonata No. 1 for Cello and Piano, 1963
Sonata for Double Bass and Piano, 1964
Sonata for Flute and Piano, 1964
Sonata No. 2 for Cello and Piano, 1965

Books
Cooper, Paul. Dimensions of SIght Singing: An Anthology. New York: Longman. 1981.
Cooper, Paul. Perspectives in Music Theory: An Historical-Analytical Approach. New York: Dodd Mead. 1973.

Notes

References
Lee, Minyoung. "Paul Cooper's Sinfonia: An Analysis." DMA dissertation, Rice University, 2002.

Shulman, Laurie. "Paul Cooper," in Oxford Music Online.

External links
The Paul Cooper papers at the Fondren Library, Rice University
Paul Cooper page from Schirmer site
Interview with Paul Cooper, December 18, 1987

USC Thornton School of Music alumni
University of Michigan faculty
University of Cincinnati faculty
Rice University faculty